Pannell is an unincorporated community in Walton County, in the U.S. state of Georgia.

History
Variant names were "Cowpens" and "Easleys Cowpens." The present name is after Wiley Hill Pannell, an early settler.

References

Unincorporated communities in Walton County, Georgia
Unincorporated communities in Georgia (U.S. state)